Brent Allen Staker (born 23 May 1984) is a former professional Australian rules footballer who played for the West Coast Eagles and  in the Australian Football League (AFL).

Early life
Staker grew up in Broken Hill in remote country New South Wales.
He went to Burke Ward Public School where he made a time capsule to be opened on 2020. He made his A Grade debut in 2000 at age 16 for West Broken Hill, playing in their losing grand final side that year.

AFL career

West Coast
Recruited from NSW/ACT Rams (Under 18s), he made his debut in 2003.
	 
In round seven 2004, he earned an AFL Rising Star nomination when he kicked three goals against Melbourne.

Barry Hall incident
In Round 4, 2008, Brent Staker was punched in the face by Sydney Swans full-forward Barry Hall. Video footage from the incident indicated that contact was made with a punch to the jaw. Staker took no further part in the game, remaining off the field for the duration of the game. Hall's punch was graded by the Match Review Panel as intentional, severe impact and high contact, and he was referred to the tribunal and suspended for seven games, one of the most severe punishments in the modern era by the AFL Tribunal. Video footage of the incident was shown on television as far abroad as Denmark and the United States on the ESPN network.

Brisbane
At the end of the 2009 season Staker told the Eagles that he wished to be traded away from Western Australia; the Eagles traded him to the Brisbane Lions with its third round draft pick (#39 overall) for Bradd Dalziell.

In August 2015, he announced his retirement from the AFL, effective at the end of the 2015 season. Prior to what would have been his final match, he injured his hamstring in the warmup, and was a late withdrawal.

Statistics

|- style="background-color: #EAEAEA"
! scope="row" style="text-align:center" | 2003
|
| 41 || 7 || 3 || 3 || 29 || 23 || 52 || 15 || 13 || 0.4 || 0.4 || 4.1 || 3.3 || 7.4 || 2.1 || 1.9
|-
! scope="row" style="text-align:center" | 2004
|
| 41 || 17 || 6 || 11 || 92 || 61 || 153 || 70 || 25 || 0.4 || 0.6 || 5.4 || 3.6 || 9.0 || 4.1 || 1.5
|- style="background-color: #EAEAEA"
! scope="row" style="text-align:center" | 2005
|
| 41 || 22 || 13 || 7 || 174 || 86 || 260 || 97 || 22 || 0.6 || 0.3 || 7.9 || 3.9 || 11.8 || 4.4 || 1.0
|-
! scope="row" style="text-align:center" | 2006
|
| 41 || 23 || 24 || 15 || 169 || 103 || 272 || 113 || 41 || 1.0 || 0.7 || 7.3 || 4.5 || 11.8 || 4.9 || 1.8
|- style="background-color: #EAEAEA"
! scope="row" style="text-align:center" | 2007
|
| 41 || 21 || 20 || 17 || 179 || 107 || 286 || 100 || 36 || 1.0 || 0.8 || 8.5 || 5.1 || 13.6 || 4.8 || 1.7
|-
! scope="row" style="text-align:center" | 2008
|
| 41 || 14 || 13 || 8 || 124 || 78 || 202 || 58 || 39 || 0.9 || 0.6 || 8.9 || 5.6 || 14.4 || 4.1 || 2.8
|- style="background-color: #EAEAEA"
! scope="row" style="text-align:center" | 2009
|
| 41 || 6 || 5 || 2 || 41 || 26 || 67 || 16 || 18 || 0.8 || 0.3 || 6.8 || 4.3 || 11.2 || 2.7 || 3.0
|-
! scope="row" style="text-align:center" | 2010
|
| 14 || 22 || 10 || 15 || 233 || 146 || 379 || 126 || 55 || 0.5 || 0.7 || 10.6 || 6.6 || 17.2 || 5.7 || 2.5
|- style="background-color: #EAEAEA"
! scope="row" style="text-align:center" | 2011
|
| 14 || 7 || 4 || 2 || 49 || 42 || 91 || 24 || 13 || 0.6 || 0.3 || 7.0 || 6.0 || 13.0 || 3.4 || 1.9
|-
! scope="row" style="text-align:center" | 2012
|
| 14 || 0 || — || — || — || — || — || — || — || — || — || — || — || — || — || —
|- style="background-color: #EAEAEA"
! scope="row" style="text-align:center" | 2013
|
| 14 || 15 || 21 || 7 || 133 || 59 || 192 || 69 || 29 || 1.4 || 0.5 || 8.9 || 3.9 || 12.8 || 4.6 || 1.9
|-
! scope="row" style="text-align:center" | 2014
|
| 14 || 0 || — || — || — || — || — || — || — || — || — || — || — || — || — || —
|- style="background-color: #EAEAEA"
! scope="row" style="text-align:center" | 2015
|
| 14 || 6 || 0 || 6 || 29 || 18 || 47 || 17 || 12 || 0.0 || 1.0 || 4.8 || 3.0 || 7.8 || 2.8 || 2.0
|- class="sortbottom"
! colspan=3| Career
! 160
! 119
! 93
! 1252
! 749
! 2001
! 705
! 303
! 0.7
! 0.6
! 7.8
! 4.7
! 12.5
! 4.4
! 1.9
|}

References

External links

1984 births
Living people
West Coast Eagles players
Brisbane Lions players
Australian rules footballers from New South Wales
NSW/ACT Rams players
West Broken Hill Football Club players
East Fremantle Football Club players